Xenosiren is an extinct genus of dugong which existed in Mexico during the Micoene.

References

Miocene sirenians
Fossil taxa described in 1989
Prehistoric placental genera